William Bradford (September 14, 1755 – August 23, 1795) was a lawyer and judge from Philadelphia, Pennsylvania, and the second United States Attorney General in 1794–1795.

He was the son of the printer William Bradford and was born in Philadelphia.  He began his education at the Academy of Philadelphia, then attended Princeton University, where he formed a lifelong friendship with Virginian James Madison, before graduating in 1772. When he returned to Philadelphia he read law with Edward Shippen. His progress was delayed by the American Revolutionary War.

In 1776, when the Pennsylvania militia was called out, William volunteered as a private. Later that year, the militia was organized into a "flying camp" with Daniel Roberdeau as the first brigadier general in the states forces. General Roberdeau chose the young man as an aide, and later promoted him to brigade major on his headquarters staff.

When his militia term expired, he joined the Continental Army as a captain and company commander in the 11th Pennsylvania Regiment commanded by Richard Hampton. By the end of the year, he saw action in the Battle of Trenton. While at Morristown, New Jersey, he was named a deputy to the muster master-general on April 10, 1777, and he was promoted to lieutenant colonel. During the encampment at Valley Forge in late 1777 and early 1778, his headquarters was at the David Havard House.  He resigned after two years due to ill health and returned home in early 1779.

Bradford joined the bar before the Pennsylvania Supreme Court in September 1779. He was named as the state's Attorney General in 1780, and served until 1791. In 1784, he married Susan Vergereau Boudinot, the only daughter of Elias Boudinot. The following year, 1785, Bradford was elected a member of the American Philosophical Society. On August 2, 1791 Bradford represented General William West and argued the first recorded case before the U.S. Supreme Court, West v. Barnes losing the decision. On August 22, 1791, Bradford was appointed to the Supreme Court of Pennsylvania, and served for three years.

In 1793, Governor Thomas Mifflin asked his help to reduce the use of the death penalty.  His report to the legislature was in the form of an essay, "An Inquiry how far the Punishment of Death is Necessary in Pennsylvania". In the next reorganization of Pennsylvania's penal code, the use of capital punishment was substantially reduced. Other states followed the Pennsylvania example.

On January 8, 1794, George Washington named him Attorney General for the United States to replace Edmund Randolph. He died while in office in 1795, and is buried with his wife's family in Saint Mary's Episcopal Churchyard in Burlington, New Jersey.  A cenotaph for Bradford was built at his family's burial plot in Laurel Hill Cemetery in Philadelphia.

Bradford County, Pennsylvania, was named in his honor.

References

External links
Biography at the University of Pennsylvania
Attorneys General of the United States: William Bradford, United States Department of Justice.

|-

1755 births
1795 deaths
American people of English descent
Continental Army officers from Pennsylvania
Pennsylvania Attorneys General
Lawyers from Philadelphia
Princeton University alumni
United States Attorneys General
Washington administration cabinet members
18th-century American politicians
American lawyers admitted to the practice of law by reading law